The Last Witness is a British-Polish thriller film directed by Piotr Szkopiak based on a stage play by Paul Szambowski.

The film stars Alex Pettyfer, Robert Więckiewicz, Talulah Riley, Michael Gambon, Will Thorp, Henry Lloyd-Hughes and Gwilym Lee. The film was released in Poland by Kino Świat on 156 screens on 11 May 2018, in the United States by Momentum Pictures on 29 May 2018 and through video on demand by Sony Pictures Home Entertainment beginning on 5 June 2018. It was released in the United Kingdom by Signature Entertainment on 17 August 2018. It won 44 festival awards and was screened at film festivals around the world including in Los Angeles, New York, Chicago, Toronto & Sydney.

The film deals with the impact of the political intrigue surrounding the Katyn Massacre on Polish servicemen and women in the UK after the Second World War. While the framework put together for the purposes of the film is very largely fictional, the death of Loboda (a Russian, not Polish, peasant) outside Bristol on October 30th 1947 is a real event dismissed officially in the UK as suicide.

Plot
A young, ambitious journalist risks love, career and ultimately his life to uncover the true identity of an Eastern European refugee and his connection to the British Government's collusion in the cover-up of the Katyn massacre, one of Stalin's most notorious crimes.

Cast
 Alex Pettyfer as Stephen Underwood
 Robert Więckiewicz as Michael Loboda
 Talulah Riley as Jeanette Mitchell
 Michael Gambon as Frank Hamilton
 Will Thorp as Colonel Janusz Pietrowski
 Henry Lloyd-Hughes as Mason Mitchell
 Piotr Stramowski as Andrzej Nowak
 Gwilym Lee as John Underwood
 Charles De'Ath as the Police Sergeant
 Luke de Woolfson as Thomas Derrick 
 Michael Byrne as the Coroner
 Anita Carey as Joan Caldercott
 Holly Aston as Rose Miller
 Pate Wayre as an RAF Sq. Leader & a patron in the pub

Release
The Last Witness was released in Poland by Kino Świat on 11 May 2018, in the United States by Momentum Pictures on 29 May 2018 and in the United Kingdom by Signature Entertainment on 17 August 2018.

References

External links
 
 
 
 Pop Culturalist Chats with The Last Witness’ Piotr Szkopiak
 “Create your own style.” — Meet Piotr Szkopiak, writer/director of the WWII, based on a true story thriller The Last Witness
 Cinephellas The Last Witness – Interview with Piotr Szkopiak
 Culture Trip The Last Witness A Brooding British Thriller Probes the Katyn Massacre Cover-Up
 J.B.Spins The Last Witness: The Katyn Cover-Up
 why so blu? Encapsulated Movie Reviews
Quiet Earth Writer/Director Piotr Szkopiak on His 15 Year-Long Quest to Make THE LAST WITNESS [Interview]
 Reel Talker INTERVIEW: FILMMAKER PIOTR SZKOPIAK
 21 Infantry

2018 films
British thriller drama films
Polish thriller drama films
2010s English-language films
English-language Polish films
2010s British films